Farah Jasmine Griffin (born 1963) is an American academic and professor specializing in African-American literature. She is William B. Ransford Professor of English and Comparative Literature and African-American Studies, chair of the African American and African Diaspora Studies Department, and Director Elect of the Columbia University Institute for Research in African American Studies at Columbia University.

She received her BA degree from Harvard University in 1985. She completed her PhD from Yale University in 1992.

In 2021, she received a Guggenheim Fellowship.

Bibliography 

 If You Can't Be Free, Be a Mystery: In Search of Billie Holiday (Free Press, 2001)
 Clawing at the Limits of Cool: Miles Davis, John Coltrane, and the Greatest Jazz Collaboration Ever with Salim Washington (St. Martin's, 2008)
 Harlem Nocturne: Women Artists and Progressive Politics During World War II (Basic Books, 2013)
 "Who Set You Flowin'?": The African-American Migration Narrative (Oxford University Press, 1995)
 Beloved Sisters and Loving Friends: Letters from Rebecca Primus of Royal Oak, Maryland, and Addie Brown of Hartford, Connecticut, 1854-1868, ed. (Alfred A. Knopf, 1999)
 Uptown Conversation: The New Jazz Studies, ed. with Robert G. O'Meally and Brent Hayes Edwards (Columbia University Press, 2004)
 Inclusive Scholarship: Developing Black Studies in the United States: A 25th Anniversary Retrospective of Ford Foundation Grant Making, 1982-2007 (Ford Foundation, 2007)

References

External links
 
 

1963 births
Living people
Columbia University faculty
Harvard University alumni
Yale University alumni
African-American academics
American women academics
American academic administrators
African-American educators
American women non-fiction writers
21st-century African-American people
21st-century African-American women
20th-century African-American people
20th-century African-American women
African-American women writers